Platydoris sabulosa is a species of sea slug, a dorid nudibranch, shell-less marine opisthobranch gastropod mollusks in the family Discodorididae.

Distribution
This species was described from Sumilon Island, Oslob, Cebu, Philippines, . It has been reported from southeast Queensland, Australia.

References

External links 
 

Discodorididae
Gastropods described in 2002